Carmen Maria Martinez (born 1950) is a United States diplomat and a career foreign service officer. She served as the United States Ambassador to Zambia from 2005 to 2008. Prior to that assignment, she was the Chargé d'Affaires ad interim to Burma from August 2002 to August 2005. Burma had no U.S. ambassador from 1990 until 2012, so Martinez, as chargé d'affaires, was the senior diplomat in the embassy and the head of the mission.

References

External links
U.S. Department of State: Ambassadors to Burma
U.S. Department of State: Biography of Carmen M. Martinez (labelled out-of-date)
U.S. Embassy in Lusaka: Biography of the ambassador

1950 births
Living people
Ambassadors of the United States to Myanmar
Ambassadors of the United States to Zambia
Hispanic and Latino American diplomats
United States Foreign Service personnel
American women ambassadors
21st-century American women